is a Japanese competitive swimmer. He is the world record holder in the short course 200 metre butterfly. He won a silver medal at the 2020 Summer Olympics in the men's 200 metre butterfly event.

Career

2018–2019
In August 2018, when Honda was 16 years old, he won the bronze medal in the 200 metre butterfly with a time of 1:58.70 and a silver medal in the 4×100 metre medley relay with a final time of 3:41.95 at the 2018 Junior Pan Pacific Swimming Championships in Suva, Fiji. The following year, at the 2019 FINA World Junior Swimming Championships held in August at Danube Arena in Budapest, Hungary, he won the silver medal in the 200 metre butterfly with a final mark of 1:55.31, sharing the podium with gold medalist Luca Urlando of the United States and bronze medalist Federico Burdisso of Italy.

2021–2022
Leading up to the 2020 Olympic Games, in April 2021 in Tokyo, Honda was one of two male swimmers to make the Japan Olympic Team in the 200 metre butterfly. At the 2020 Summer Olympics, held in the summer of 2021 in Tokyo, he finished second in the final of the 200 metre butterfly to win the silver medal with a time of 1:53.73, which was 2.48 seconds behind gold medalist Kristóf Milák of Hungary and 0.72 seconds ahead of bronze medalist Federico Burdisso. The following summer, at the 2022 World Aquatics Championships in Budapest, Hungary, he won the bronze medal in the 200 metre butterfly, this time finishing behind gold medalist Kristóf Milák and silver medalist Léon Marchand of France with a time of 1:53.61. Three days earlier in the Championships, he finished in a time of 4:12.20 in the final of the 400 metre individual medley to place seventh. On 22 October 2022, he won the gold medal in the short course 200 metre butterfly at the 64th edition of Japan's National Short Course Championships, held in Tokyo, with a world record time of 1:46.85.

International championships

Personal best times

Long course metres (50 m pool)

Short course metres (25 m pool)

World records

Short course metres (25 m pool)

References

External links
 

2001 births
Living people
Japanese male butterfly swimmers
World record setters in swimming
World record holders in swimming
Medalists at the 2020 Summer Olympics
Olympic silver medalists in swimming
Olympic silver medalists for Japan
Olympic swimmers of Japan
Swimmers at the 2020 Summer Olympics
Sportspeople from Yokohama
World Aquatics Championships medalists in swimming
21st-century Japanese people